Barren strawberry is a common name for several plants which may refer to:
 Potentilla, or in particular Potentilla sterilis, native to Europe
 Waldsteinia fragarioides, native to eastern North America

See also 
 Mock strawberry, Potentilla indica a.k.a. Duchesnea indica, native to eastern and southern Asia